Sergey Yurievich Kuznetsov (born 14 June 1966) is a contemporary Russian writer, journalist, entrepreneur and educator.

Early life
Kuznetsov was born in Moscow to Galina Kuznetsova, a French language and French literature teacher, and Yuri Kuznetsov, a well-known Soviet/Russian chemist. In 1988, Kuznetsov graduated from Moscow State University's Department of Chemistry.

Career

Literary career

Butterfly Skin was translated into English, German, French, Polish, Hungarian, Czech, Dutch, and other languages. The publishers called it a Russian take on Silence of the Lambs, but critics pointed out that Kuznetsov "aims for more than smug nihilism. He delivers a gratifying conclusion to a sometimes overburdened and sickening journey through sadism and alienation."

His novel The Round Dance of Water  was translated into Arabic and English. The book must be published in the US in July 2022 by Dalkey Archive Press.

His most recent novel, Kaleidoscope: Expendable Materials, received praise from both readers and critics. Lisa Hayden, a recognized literary translator, wrote: ‘What I enjoy is reading about upheaval and how it affects and even connects characters that pop in and out of the chapters like pieces in a kaleidoscope".

Member of PEN Club and Russian Union of Cinematographers.

Journalism
In 1996 he started to write articles on pop culture for various magazines and online media. After returning from Stanford to Russia in 2002, Kuznetsov continued to work in journalism.

Kuznetsov took part in forming post-Soviet independent journalism in Russia, focusing mainly on movies and literature. He contributed to Russian editions of Premiere, Harper's Bazaar, Vogue and other magazines. He participated in multiple online projects.

In 2006, he launched Booknik, a daily online project on Jewish literature and culture that took a hard-copy quarterly form from 2007 to 2013, called Booknik Reader. In 2011, as editor-in-chief of the publication, Kuznetsov was awarded Man of the Year 5771 by the Federation of Jewish Communities of Russia.

Kuznetsov is a semi-regular contributor to American periodicals, including The New York Times, The Huffington Post and others.

Entrepreneur
In 2004, Kuznetsov and his wife Ekaterina Kadieva founded a digital marketing agency called SKCG (an acronym for Sergey Kuznetsov Content Group), aimed at developing and supporting social media projects. The company had offices in Kyiv, Ukraine as well as Paris, France and in the United States; international clients include Nike, Audi, Nokia, Estée Lauder, Efes, Jeep, Bosch and other major corporations.

Educator

In 2014, Kuznetsov and his wife Ekaterina founded Marabou Science Camp, an educational project for Russian children in Europe. In 2021 the first Marabou camp was launched in the USA. 

In 2016 Sergey and Ekaterina launched a Science & Vacation Program aimed at explaining science to an adult audience. Financial Times called it "a company that specialises in luxury learning with a scientific bent". One of S&V's first events was dedicated to neurophysics of scents. The lectures are legendary perfume critic Luca Turin and parfum blogger Victoria Frolova.

In 2018, Sergey, together with Ekaterina, launched the international middle school Le Sallay Academy, based on a blended learning model of a combination of on-site sessions and online classes. In its English-language publication, Forbes called this school "pioneers of blended education for pre-teens". Relocate Magazine shortlisted Le Sallay Academy in Relocate Award 2022 as a School excellence for relocation & transition care. 

In 2020, the Russian branch of the school was opened, in 2022 it is planned to open an American branch.

Personal life 
Kuznetsov married Inna Kuznetsova in 1987. The couple divorced in 1993. In 1995, he married psychologist Ekaterina Kadieva. He has three children: Ekaterina (born in 1987), Anna (born in 1996) and Daniel (born in 2001).

He has lived in Paris since 2013.

Recognition 
In 2001, he received a Knight Fellowship from Stanford University and moved to the U.S. state of California for a year.

References

External links

1966 births
Living people
Russian journalists
Writers from Moscow
20th-century Russian businesspeople
21st-century Russian businesspeople
20th-century Russian writers
21st-century Russian writers